Smudge may refer to:

Cats 
 Smudge (Blue Peter cat), one of the Blue Peter pets
 Smudge (meme cat), from the woman yelling at a cat internet meme
 Smudge (People's Palace cat), the Glasgow People's Palace cat

Other uses 
 Smudge (band), an Australian band
 Smudge (comics), a character in The Beano
 Smudge (film), 1922 American silent comedy-drama
 Smudge (Monica's Gang), a character in Monica's Gang

See also
 Smudge attack, touchscreen information extraction method
 Smudge pot, oil-burning device used to prevent frost on fruit trees
 Smudge stick, a type of incense